Shree Shree Mohanananda Brahmachari (17 December 1904 – 29 August 1999) was a Brahmagya Mahapurush and an Indian guru. He was the second Mohanta (Head) of the Ram Niwas Brahmacharya Ashram, Deoghar. He also created number of trusts, social service foundations, hospitals, medical centers, and schools under his Guru's name, Guru Sri Sri Balananda Brahmachari across India.

His childhood name was Manmohon Banerjee and was second son of Sri Hem Chandra Banerjee and Srimoti Binoyini Debi. He was born at Khaprelbazar in Midnapur town of West Bengal. By birth He is descendant of Bhatta Narayan Family and belonging to "Sandilya Gotra". He studied at C.M.S School of Bhagalpur, and on English Medium School of Dhanbad. He passed Entrance equivalent to Matriculation / Secondary Examination in first division in the year 1920. He studied intermediate in Scottish Church College and stayed in Ogilivie Hostel.

Sri Mohanananda Brahmachari Maharaj, almost universally addressed as Maharajji, was a major spiritual force in India and abroad for over six decades from 1937 till 1999.

Early life
He took birth on 17 December 1904 in the town of Midnapore in Bengal province. His parents, a devout Brahmin couple, Binayani Devi and Hemachandra Bandopadhaya were devotees and disciples of Sri Balananda Brahmachari, a great saint who had taken up residence in the temple town of Deoghar in Bihar province. Sri Manamohan, as he was then named, passed his Entrance Examination in 1920 from Dhanbad English High School. Thereafter, he joined the Scottish Church College in Calcutta for his graduate studies and stayed in the Ogilvie Hostel. His classmates later remembered him for his pleasant yet indrawn personality, and for his touch of artistic sophistication which he brought to every task. Later on, it became apparent that Sri Manamohan had developed a great attraction for the divine life during this time and had begun practicing various austerities as well as studying several religious thought leaders such as Swami Vivekananda and Sri Aurobindo. He had also collected detailed information about the religious practices followed at Deoghar Ashram from his family. Finally, he left the hostel on September 9, 1921 and travelled to the Deoghar ashram of Sri Balananda Brahmachari.

Spiritual training and enlightenment
Over the next three weeks, Sri Balananda Brahmachari thoroughly tested the resolve of young Sri Manamohan and, after obtaining the consent of his parents as well, admitted him to the monastic life as Sri Mohanananda Brahmachari. His life at the Ashram was marked by the practice of severe austerity, the single-minded devotion and service to his Guru, and the total conformity with most rigid disciplines prescribed in the scriptures.

The smooth and efficient management of the diverse activities at the Ashram was given due attention while he continued with the most rigorous 'tapasya' and undertook many arduous pilgrimages to numerous sacred places. Even after Sri Balananda Brahmachari passed away on 9 June 1927, Sri Mohanananda Brahmachari continued these arduous monastic pursuits. Only after receiving an express command from his Guru, given in a vision while he was practicing austerities at holy Naimisharanya, did Sri Maharaj assume the most difficult task of arousing the spiritual potential of people on a large scale by going himself to the devotees while adhering to the stringent discipline of "naisthikbrahmacharya". Sri Maharaj also founded many institutions for the material welfare of the public at large. All these activities were instituted to further his belief that sadhus (holy men) had the duty to contribute significantly to human society.

Spiritual practice and establishments
Guru Mohrajji continued the Guru Parampara of ancient vedic practices for the benefit of humankind and all beings in entire universe. He expanded upong his Guru's work and went on setting up charitable ashrams to establish Dharma in its pristine form. Apart from the major Hindu festivals being conducted in Vedic ways across ashrams, he also used to conduct the extremely difficult Vishnu Lakshmi Yagna for benefit of universe.

His permanent state of spiritual divine glow blessed the souls of all beings fortunate enough to witness. The enormous spiritual powers accumulated through his Sadhana were never made explicit, except for the aura of ineffable peace which always emanated from him.

Teachings and Amrita Lahiri
Very early in his life, Sri Mohanananda Brahmachari had learned that music and songs were very effective instruments available for arousing divine consciousness in the human spirit. He was deeply attracted by the lyrics and music of Rabindranath Tagore during his college days and he also witnessed the ability of the saint, Ramdas Babaji Maharaj, to bring ecstasy to massed crowds through his Kirtan.

Having the gift of a sweet and melodious voice himself, Sri Maharaj regularly performed Kirtan at Deoghar Ashram and even his Guru was moved by his music. Sri Maharaj was thoroughly eclectic in his choice of lyrics. Apart from his own numerous compositions, Sri Maharaj liberally drew upon the works of Nanak, Brahmananda, Vidyapati, Surdas and other classical devotional compositions, as well as from the works of modern poets, most notably of Rabindranath as well as Girish Chandra, Atul Prasad and others. However, he did not hesitate to modify either the lyrics or the tune in order to create the maximum impact in the minds of the listeners. His audience, however, did not always know the lyrics. Finally, Sri Gobinda Prasad Ghose, a disciple of Sri Balananda Brahmachari, undertook the task of collating the Kirtan lyrics through laborious transcription, and published the volume in July 1955. Pleased with the effort, Sri Maharaj named this volume Amrita Lahari or Waves of Nectar. Subsequently, a second volume was also published under the name Sudha Sagar or Sea of Nectar, bestowed by Sri Maharaj. Later on, the two volumes were merged into a single entity under the initial name of Amrita Lahari, and the combined volume has undergone many editions with an ever expanding inventory of songs.

Samadhi

Sri Maharaj left the mortal world at McMinville, Tennessee on August 29, 1999, but the soothing and uplifting influence of his memory, and of his Kirtans, continues to bring solace and joy to his innumerable disciples, devotees and admirers across the world even today.

References

External links
 Guru Sri Sri Balananda Brahmachari
 Sri Sri Mohanananda Brahmachari
http://amritalahari.com/biography.php

1903 births
1999 deaths
20th-century Hindu religious leaders
Bengali Hindus
Bengali people
Indian Hindu spiritual teachers
Indian Hindu monks
People from Midnapore
Scottish Church College alumni